Serhiivka (or) is an urban-type settlement in Bilhorod-Dnistrovskyi Raion of Odesa Oblast in Ukraine. Serhiivka hosts the administration of Serhiivka settlement hromada, one of the hromadas of Ukraine. Population: 

Until 18 July 2020, Serhiivka belonged to Bilhorod-Dnistrovskyi Municipality. The municipality was abolished as an administrative unit in July 2020 as part of the administrative reform of Ukraine, which reduced the number of raions of Odesa Oblast to seven. The area of Bilhorod-Dnistrovskyi Municipality was merged into Bilhorod-Dnistrovskyi Raion.

On 1 July 2022, a residential building and a recreation center in Serhiivka were hit by Russian rockets. At least 21 people were killed.

Economy

Transportation
The closest railway station is in Bilhorod-Dnistrovskyi, which has infrequent passenger connections with Odesa and Izmail.

The settlement has access to Highway H33 which connects Odesa and Bilhorod-Dnistrovskyi.

References

Urban-type settlements in Bilhorod-Dnistrovskyi Raion